The American golden plover (Pluvialis dominica), is a medium-sized plover. The genus name is Latin and means relating to rain, from pluvia, "rain".  It was believed that golden plovers flocked when rain was imminent.  The species name dominica refers to Santo Domingo, now Hispaniola, in the West Indies.

American golden plover and picked up the spores while lining their nests. Then when the birds arrive in new places they molt, leaving behind the feathers and their precious cargo to start growing again at the other end of the world.

Description

Measurements:

 Length: 
 Weight: 
 Wingspan: 

The breeding adult American golden plover has a black face, neck, breast, and belly, with a white crown and nape that extends to the side of the breast. The back is mottled black and white with pale, gold spots. The breeding female is similar, but with less black. The head is small, along with the bill.

It is similar to two other golden plovers, European and Pacific. The American golden plover is smaller, slimmer and relatively longer-legged than European golden plover (Pluvialis apricaria) which also has white axillary (armpit) feathers. It is more similar to Pacific golden plover (Pluvialis fulva) with which it was once considered conspecific under the name "lesser golden plover". The Pacific golden plover is slimmer than the American species, has a shorter primary projection, and longer legs, and is usually yellower on the back.

Distribution
The breeding habitat of American golden plover is Arctic tundra from northern Canada and Alaska. They nest on the ground in a dry open area. They are migratory and winter in southern South America. They follow an elliptical migration path; northbound birds pass through Central America about January–April and stage in great numbers in places like Illinois before their final push north. In fall, they take a more easterly route, flying mostly over the western Atlantic and Caribbean Sea to the wintering grounds in Patagonia. Of this,  is over open ocean where it cannot stop to feed or drink. It does this from body fat stores that it stocks up on prior to the flight. It is a regular vagrant to western Europe.

A comparison of dates and migratory patterns leads to the conclusion that Eskimo curlews and American golden plovers were the most likely shore birds to have attracted the attention of Christopher Columbus to the nearby Americas in early October 1492, after 65 days at sea out of sight of land.

American golden plover and picked up the spores while lining their nests. Then when the birds arrive in new places they molt, leaving behind the feathers and their precious cargo to start growing again at the other end of the world.

Behavior

Breeding

This bird uses scrape nests, lining them with lichens, grass, and leaves. At its breeding grounds, it is very territorial, displaying aggressively to neighbors. Some American plovers are also territorial in their wintering grounds.

The American golden plover lays a clutch of four white to buff eggs that are heavily blotched with both black and brown spots. These eggs are incubated for a period of 26 to 27 days, with the male incubating during the day and the female during the night. The chicks then hatch , leaving the nest within hours and feeding themselves within a day.

Diet
These birds forage for food on tundra, fields, beaches and tidal flats, usually by sight. They eat terrestrial earthworms, terrestrial snails, insects, insect larvae, crustaceans, fish, berries and seeds.

Status
Large numbers were shot in the late 19th century and the population has never fully recovered.

References

Further reading

External links 

 American golden plover at ENature.com
 
 
 
 
 
 
 
 
 

American golden plover
Native birds of Alaska
Birds of North America
Birds of South America
Birds of Hispaniola
Birds of the Dominican Republic
American golden plover
American golden plover